Chita Foras (1900–1986), was an Italian-Argentine actress noted for her work in silent and sound films.

Biography
Born Josefína Foras Cossini, Chita Foras was an actress who appeared in numerous films during cinema's golden age. She worked in film and theater for more than three decades.

She married filmmaker Nelo Cosimi in March 1929.

She was part of the on-air staff of LRA Radio Nacional Buenos Aires who put on the radio play Las dos carátulas: El teatro de la humanidad in the 1980s, along with actors such as Adolfo Duncan, Claudia Durán, Adrián Di Stefano, Liliana Giménez, Miguel Ángel Medrano, Ricardo Lani, Haydeé Lesquer, Néstor Losadas, Norma Agüero, Rodolfo Caraballo, Enrique Conlazo, Noemí Deis, Osvaldo Demarco, and Inés Mariscal. She performed works such as Se necesita niñera by Mario Herbert Lago.

She died of natural causes in Buenos Aires in 1986.

Theater

She was part of "La Compañía Leonor Rinaldí", with a cast which also included  and Alicia Rojas.

In the 1930s she had lead parts in several plays at the legendary theater "El Orfeón de Arturo Greco".

In April 1935 she was part of "La Compañía Argentina de Comedias Y Sainetes de Cordero-Sandrini" in the work Riachuelo, together with Luis Sandrini, Chela Cordero, María Ricard, Laila González, and Máximo Moyano.

In 1947 she joined the "Compañía Española de Comedias de Teresa Silva y ", debuting with a musical parody in the Teatro Cómico. She made an Echegaray drama titled ¡Ay!, which had a large cast, including , Nina Marcó Susana Sux, Lilia Bedrune, and Rodolfo Martincho.

She made the 1950 comedy El vivo vive del zonzo by Antonio Botta and Marcos Bronenmerg, with a cast including Conchi Sánchez, Olga Duncan, Mabel Cabello, Pura Delgui, María T. Gutiérrez, Julio Bianquet, Arturo Bs mió, Ego Brunoldi, Leónidas Brandl, Andrés López, and Raúl Cúneo.

Filmography
 1923: Buenos Aires también tiene
 1924: 
 1925: Empleada se necesita
 1926: El Lobo de la Ribera
 1927: Federales y unitarios
 1928: Regeneración
 1928: 
 1928: La mujer y la bestia
 1930: 
 1930: Corazón ante la ley
 1931: 
 1940: El cantor del circo
 1954: Caídos en el infierno

References

External links
 

1900 births
1986 deaths
Argentine radio actresses
Argentine silent film actresses
Italian emigrants to Argentina